José de León y Echales was the Spanish governor of Trinidad in 1699.  He was killed by an arrow in the Arena Massacre, taking three days to die, his body was thrown into a river, where it was found by the Spanish.

Further reading
 P J Buissink; Historical Society of Trinidad and Tobago, Documents relating to the massacre of the governor, Don José de Leon y Echales, other officials and missionaries at San Francisco de la Arena, by Indians, on 1st December, 1699., Trinidad and Tobago, A.L. Rhodes, 1938.

References

Governors of Trinidad and Tobago
1699 deaths
17th-century Spanish people
Spanish West Indies
Spanish period of Trinidad and Tobago
Spanish murder victims
Trinidad and Tobago murder victims
People murdered in Trinidad and Tobago
Year of birth missing